Corasoides is a genus of South Pacific intertidal spiders that was first described by Arthur Gardiner Butler in 1929. Originally placed with the Agelenidae, it was moved to the Stiphidiidae in 1973, and to the Desidae after a 2017 genetic study.

Species
 it contains ten species, found in Australia and Papua New Guinea:
Corasoides angusi Humphrey, 2017 – Papua New Guinea
Corasoides australis Butler, 1929 (type) – Australia
Corasoides cowanae Humphrey, 2017 – Papua New Guinea
Corasoides motumae Humphrey, 2017 – Australia (New South Wales)
Corasoides mouldsi Humphrey, 2017 – Australia (Queensland)
Corasoides nebula Humphrey, 2017 – Papua New Guinea
Corasoides nimbus Humphrey, 2017 – Papua New Guinea
Corasoides occidentalis Humphrey, 2017 – Australia (Western Australia)
Corasoides stellaris Humphrey, 2017 – Papua New Guinea
Corasoides terania Humphrey, 2017 – Australia (Queensland, New South Wales)

See also
 List of Desidae species

References

Araneomorphae genera
Desidae
Spiders of Australia
Taxa named by Arthur Gardiner Butler